Marfranc is a commune in the Jérémie Arrondissement, in the Grand'Anse department of Haiti. The town was made a commune by presidential decree on 22 July 2015 made it a commune.

References

Populated places in Grand'Anse (department)
Communes of Haiti